The Association of British Dispensing Opticians (ABDO) is the main professional association for opticians in the UK.

History
ABDO was formed in 1986 from the merger of the Association of Dispensing Opticians and the Faculty of Dispensing Opticians, following the Health and Social Security Act of 1984. The profession of dispensing opticians has been regulated voluntarily since 1926 and, as a statutory profession, by the Opticians Act since 1958. Since such time the conduct of dispensing opticians has thus been regulated partly by legal provisions, by advice given by the General Optical Council, and by ABDO’s own Advice to Fellows.

The General Optical Council was formed by the Opticians Act 1958, to make the British optician profession statutorily protected.

Structure
ABDO currently has 9,000 members and represents over 6.000 qualified dispensing opticians in the UK. It also has 500 members overseas, 500 associate members and approximately 1,800 student members worldwide.

The Association is governed by a board of directors, which consists of nine full members of the Association elected by members’ ballot. The board has a non-voting academic adviser.

The board is served by the secretariat of the Association headed by the general secretary Sir Anthony Garrett CBE HonFBDO.

The president and vice president are elected by the board from amongst its number. The term of office, for both the president and vice president, is normally two years.

ABDO is divided into the following regions within the UK:
•ABDO London
•ABDO Midlands
•ABDO North of England
•ABDO South
•ABDO Northern Ireland
•ABDO Scotland
•ABDO Wales

Within each region, a Regional Lead is supported by Sub Regional Leads who between them look after the interests of ABDO members at a local level.

The Association's registered office is at 199, Gloucester Terrace, London W2 6LD. It is situated off Bishops Bridge Road (A4206), between Royal Oak tube station, to the west, and London Paddington station, to the east. It is opposite the Hallfield Estate.

ABDO College was established at Godmersham Park, Godmersham, Kent, in 2001, on the A28. Also based at the ABDO's headquarters are the Federation of Manufacturing Opticians and Federation of Ophthalmic & Dispensing Opticians. It has a publishing division at Crowborough in East Sussex.

Optician training in the UK
Training to become an optician is available at British universities.
 ABDO College
 Anglia Ruskin University
 Aston University
 Bradford College
 City University London
 Glasgow Caledonian University
 University of Manchester

University of Central Lancashire

Function
ABDO represents the interests at a national level of British dispensing opticians. It is one of the five representative bodies that make up the Optical Confederation.

Arms

References

External links
 ABDO
 ABDO College
https://www.optical.org/en/Education/What_to_study_and_where/

Eye care in the United Kingdom
Medical associations based in the United Kingdom
British opticians
Organisations based in the City of Westminster
Organizations established in 1986
1986 establishments in the United Kingdom